The Single-Level Dome, also known as the Panorama Dome, is a type of dome coach manufactured by Colorado Railcar for various operators between 1997–2007. They are similar in concept to the company's bilevel Ultra Domes.

Design 
In a lounge configuration the cars can seat up to 76 at "four tops" (tables with 2 × 2 seating). Via Rail's three cars can seat 71–74 in a standard coach configuration. The interior color scheme for the Florida cars was "aquas, pinks and light green." The windows begin at "thigh level" and curve at the top, constituting "most of the ceiling." The Peninsula Clarion described the view as "panoramic".

Operation 
The first five cars were built for the Florida Fun Train, a short-lived service between South Florida and Orlando, Florida. These included four coaches and a lounge car with an open platform. The Florida Fun Train folded in September 1998. The Alaska Railroad acquired all five cars at bankruptcy in 1999. One of these cars was rebuilt as a business car, the Aurora. The Alaska Railroad purchased an additional three cars in 2006–2007, bringing their total to eight.

BC Rail acquired three more of the domes (intended for Florida) in 2000. After BC Rail ceased passenger operations in 2002 they were acquired by Via Rail. Dubbed "Panorama Domes", they remain in service.  two of the cars operate between Edmonton, Alberta, and Vancouver, British Columbia, on the flagship Canadian, while the third runs on the Jasper–Prince Rupert train between Jasper, Alberta, and Prince George, British Columbia.

See also 
 Ultra Dome

Notes

References

External links 

 Roster as of 2007

Vehicles introduced in 1997
Rail passenger cars of the United States
Railway coaches of Canada
Via Rail rolling stock
Alaska Railroad